Dema is a Bantu language of Mozambique. It is closely related to Shona. The population has been displaced by the construction of a dam.

References

Languages of Mozambique
Shona languages